Knock on the Sky is the third studio album by American country music trio SHeDAISY.  It was released on June 25, 2002. The two singles from this album, "Get Over Yourself" and "Mine All Mine", were minor Top 30 hits on the country charts. "Mine All Mine" was also featured on the soundtrack for the 2002 film Sweet Home Alabama and featured a video including clips from the movie.

This was SHeDAISY's weakest selling album as well; given its poor reception to radio, the group has referred to it as being "ahead of its time".

"Mine All Mine" was previously a single for Canadian country singer Tara Lyn Hart, released on her self-titled album in 1999.

Track listing

Personnel

SHeDAISY
Kassidy Osborn - background vocals
Kelsi Osborn - lead vocals
Kristyn Osborn - background vocals

Additional Musicians
Tim Akers - keyboards
Steve Brewster - drums
J.T. Corenflos - electric guitar
Eric Darken - percussion
Paul Franklin - steel guitar
Dann Huff - electric guitar
Gordon Kennedy - electric guitar
B. James Lowry - acoustic guitar
Jerry McPherson - electric guitar
Steve Nathan - keyboards
Jimmie Lee Sloas - bass guitar
John Willis - acoustic guitar
Glenn Worf - bass guitar
Jonathan Yudkin - banjo, cello, fiddle, mandocello, mandolin, viola

Charts

Weekly charts

Year-end charts

References

2002 albums
SHeDAISY albums
Lyric Street Records albums
Albums produced by Dann Huff